Midway, Minnesota may refer to the following places in the U.S. state of Minnesota:
Midway, Becker County, Minnesota, an unincorporated community
Midway, Mahnomen County, Minnesota, a census-designated place

See also 
 Midway Township, Minnesota (disambiguation)